Penicillium lassenii is an anamorph  species of the genus of Penicillium.

References

Further reading

 

lassenii
Fungi described in 1971